Uwe Storch (born 12 July 1940, Leopoldshall– Lanzarote, 17 September 2017) was a German mathematician. His field of research was
commutative algebra and analytic and algebraic geometry, in particular derivations, divisor class group, resultants.

Storch studied mathematics, physics and mathematical logic in
Münster and in
Heidelberg. He got his PhD 1966 under the supervision of Heinrich Behnke with a thesis on almost (or Q) factorial rings.
1972 Habilitation in Bochum, 1974 professor in  Osnabrück and since 1981 professor for algebra and geometry in Bochum. 2005 Emeritation. Uwe Storch is married and has four sons.

Theorem of Eisenbud–Evans–Storch

The Theorem of Eisenbud-Evans-Storch states that
every algebraic variety in n-dimensional affine space
is given geometrically (i.e. up to radical) by n polynomials.

Selected publications
Günther Scheja and Uwe Storch, Lehrbuch der Algebra, 2 volumes, Stuttgart 1980 (1st edition was in 3 volumes), 1988.

Uwe Storch and Hartmut Wiebe, Lehrbuch der Mathematik, 4 volumes.

External links 

1940 births
2017 deaths
20th-century German mathematicians
21st-century German mathematicians
Algebraists
People from Staßfurt